Johan Hübner von Holst (22 August 1881 – 13 June 1945) was a Swedish sport shooter who competed at the 1906, 1908 and 1912 Summer Olympics.

In 1906 he won the silver medal in the 30 metre duelling pistol event. He also participated in the following events:

 25 m rapid fire pistol – fifth place
 50 m pistol – tenth place
 20 m duelling pistol – 19th place
 25 m army pistol (standard model) – 21st place
 Free rifle, free position – 25th place
 300 m army rifle – 26th place

Two years later he was a member of the Swedish team which won the silver medal in the team small-bore rifle competition. He also participated in the following events:

 Team pistol – fifth place
 disappearing target small-bore rifle – 15th place
 moving target small-bore rifle – 15th place
 stationary target small-bore rifle – 18th place
 individual pistol – 27th place

At the 1912 Summer Olympics he won two gold, one silver, and one bronze medal. He also finished ninth in the 50 m rifle, prone event.

In 1914 Hübner von Holst competed in the Baltic Games in Malmö and won five gold and one bronze medal. He was a son of Lord Chamberlain Johan Gustaf von Holst and a captain in the Swedish army.

References

External links

 

1881 births
1945 deaths
Swedish male sport shooters
ISSF rifle shooters
ISSF pistol shooters
Olympic shooters of Sweden
Shooters at the 1906 Intercalated Games
Shooters at the 1908 Summer Olympics
Shooters at the 1912 Summer Olympics
Olympic gold medalists for Sweden
Olympic silver medalists for Sweden
Olympic bronze medalists for Sweden
Olympic medalists in shooting
Medalists at the 1906 Intercalated Games
Medalists at the 1908 Summer Olympics
Medalists at the 1912 Summer Olympics
Sport shooters from Stockholm